Thomas Arnold Walker (15 April 1952 – 12 May 2022), also known by the nickname of "Boxer", was an English professional rugby league footballer who played in the 1970s and 1980s.

Background
Arnold 'Boxer' Walker was born in Whitehaven, Cumberland, England, he earned the nickname 'Boxer' as a child after he received a pair of boxing gloves as a gift; in his own words, "I wore them , the name just stuck." He worked for 12-years at the Haig Colliery, Kells, Whitehaven.

He played professional rugby league for both Workington and Whitehaven and has the unusual honour of still being loved by both sets of fans, despite the fierce rivalry that exists between them. He transferred between the clubs for a fee of £30,000. He earned a reputation for being a hard man on the pitch due to his insatiable appetite for battle and fearless style of play no matter who the opposition. In October 1981, he suffered a serious neck injury in a match against Hull Kingston Rovers, resulting in the match being abandoned. He ended his playing career after suffering a second injury at the start of the 1983–84 season against Widnes. Arnold 'Boxer' Walker still resided in his home town of Kells, Whitehaven.

Playing career

International honours
Arnold 'Boxer' Walker won a cap for England while at Whitehaven in 1981 against France, and won a cap for Great Britain while at Whitehaven in 1980 against New Zealand.

International honours
Arnold 'Boxer' Walker won cap(s) for Cumbria while at Workington Town, including the 9-3 victory over New Zealand at Recreation Ground, Whitehaven during October 1980.

County Cup Final appearances
Arnold 'Boxer' Walker played  in Workington Town's 11-16 defeat by Widnes in the 1976 Lancashire County Cup Final during the 1976–77 season at Central Park, Wigan on Saturday 30 October 1976, played , scored 2-drop goals, and was man of the match in the 16-13 victory over Wigan in the 1977 Lancashire County Cup Final during the 1977–78 season at Wilderspool Stadium, Warrington on Saturday 29 October 1977, played , and was man of the match in the 13-15 defeat by Widnes in the 1978 Lancashire County Cup Final during the 1978–79 season at Central Park, Wigan on Saturday 7 October 1978, and played  in the 0-11 defeat by Widnes in the 1979 Lancashire County Cup Final during the 1979–80 season at The Willows, Salford on Saturday 8 December 1979.

Open Rugby World XIII

Honoured at both Workington Town, and Whitehaven
Arnold 'Boxer' Walker is both a Workington Town, and Whitehaven Hall Of Fame Inductee.

References

External links
The Immortals… and the Hall of Fame
(archived by web.archive.org) » Legends Evening 70's

1952 births
2022 deaths
Cumbria rugby league team players
England national rugby league team players
English rugby league players
Great Britain national rugby league team players
Rugby articles needing expert attention
Rugby league five-eighths
Rugby league halfbacks
Rugby league players from Whitehaven
Whitehaven R.L.F.C. coaches
Whitehaven R.L.F.C. players
Workington Town players